The La Crosse West Channel Bridge  is a plate girder bridge that spans the west channel of the Mississippi River between Barron Island in Wisconsin, and La Crescent, MN. Together with the Mississippi River Bridge it forms a connection between La Crescent and downtown La Crosse, Wisconsin.
The Mississippi River Bridge carries U.S. Routes 14 and 61, and forms the eastern terminus of MN-16 and the western terminus of WI 16.

Photo gallery

See also
List of crossings of the Upper Mississippi River

References

Road bridges in Minnesota
Bridges over the Mississippi River
Road bridges in Wisconsin
U.S. Route 14
U.S. Route 61
Bridges of the United States Numbered Highway System
Plate girder bridges in the United States
Buildings and structures in La Crosse, Wisconsin
Buildings and structures in Houston County, Minnesota
Interstate vehicle bridges in the United States